Knight Moves is a puzzle video game released for Windows in 1995.

Development

Gameplay
The player controls a chess knight, and must navigate around various hazards and enemies to pick up power-ups and treasure.

Reception
Next Generation reviewed the PC version of the game, rating it two stars out of five, and stated that "Coupled with a set of frustratingly difficult levels early on, Knight Moves almost seems made to disappoint puzzle gamers."

Reviews
All Game Guide (1998)

References

1995 video games
Kinesoft games
Puzzle video games
Spectrum HoloByte games
Video games developed in the United Kingdom
Windows games
Windows-only games
Single-player video games